

6½ Avenue is a north-south pedestrian passageway in Midtown Manhattan, New York City, running from West 51st to West 57th Streets between Sixth and Seventh Avenues.

The pedestrian-only avenue is a  corridor of privately owned public spaces, such as open-access lobbies and canopied space, which are open during the day. There are stop signs and stop ahead signs at six crossings between 51st and 56th Streets. The mid-block crossing at 57th Street is equipped with a traffic light. At the crosswalk areas, there are sidewalk pedestrian ramps with textured surface and flexible delineators to prevent vehicles parking in the areas.

Each intersection along the thoroughfare has a street name sign that reads " AV" and the name of the cross street to officially mark the street name. The mid-block stop signs are unusual for Manhattan, and the fractional avenue name is a new idea for the numbered street system of New York City.

History
In 2011, the Friends of Privately Owned Public Spaces proposed the creation of a six-block pathway from 51st to 57th Streets that would be mid-block between Sixth and Seventh Avenues to ease pedestrian traffic. The proposal called for connecting public spaces in the area, that were not known to most pedestrians, into a pedestrian corridor and naming it Holly Whyte Way. The idea was presented to the Community Board 5 Transportation Committee and the full Community Board 5, then the board sent a formal request to the New York City Department of Transportation (NYCDOT) in May 2011.

In March 2012, NYCDOT announced the plan, with a list of improvements, to construct a new pedestrian-only avenue. The Community Board 5 Transportation Committee unanimously voted in favor of a resolution to support the project as presented by NYCDOT on March 26, 2012. The $60,000 project was completed in July 2012.

Criticism
Drivers often fail to obey the avenue's stop signs presenting a public safety issue.

References

External links

 NYCDOT presentation

Pedestrian malls in the United States
Midtown Manhattan
Privately owned public spaces
Pedestrian infrastructure in the United States
2012 establishments in New York City